Sidney Lens (January 12, 1912 – June 18, 1986), also known by his birth name Sidney Okun, was an American labor leader, political activist, and author, best known for his 1977 book, The Day Before Doomsday, which warns of the prospect of nuclear annihilation.

Early life

Sidney Lens was born Sidney Okun on January 12, 1912, in Newark, New Jersey to Charles and Sophie Okun, Jewish immigrants from Russia who had arrived in the United States in 1907. His father, who was a pharmacist, died when Lens was three years old, and he was raised by his single mother who worked long hours in the New York City garment industry.  Lens changed his name in the early 1930s.

Career

Formerly a member of Hugo Oehler's Revolutionary Workers League, Lens was active in retail worker unions in Chicago and in the anti-war movement during the Vietnam War. Among those he was influenced by was the Dutch-American pacifist A.J. Muste.  In 1967, he was among more than 500 writers and editors who signed the "Writers and Editors War Tax Protest" pledge, vowing to refuse to pay the 10% Vietnam War Tax surcharge proposed by president Johnson.

Lens was a contributor to The Progressive and wrote more than twenty books. He ran for public office three times, culminating in 1980 when he was the Citizens Party (United States) candidate for United States Senate in Illinois.

Along with his 1977 book The Day Before Doomsday which warned of the dangers of nuclear war, Lens also wrote a history of U.S. intervention abroad, The Forging of the American Empire, originally published in 1974 and republished in 2003 by Haymarket Books with a new introduction by Howard Zinn; and an autobiography, Unrepentant Radical.

Personal life
Lens married Chicago public school teacher and fellow progressive Shirley Rubin in 1946.  He had no children.

Death and legacy
Lens died from melanoma in Chicago on June 18, 1986. His archives are preserved by the Chicago History Museum Research Center.  The Sidney Lens Photograph Collection is held in the University Library at California State University, Northridge.  This collection consists of photographs taken by Sidney Lens, who is depicted in some of the images. Other papers and books related to the legacy of Sidney Lens are also held at the CSUN University Library Special Collections and Archives.

Bibliography
John Dewey, a Marxian critique [Chicago] Revolutionary workers league, U.S. 1942 written under his birth name, Sid Okun
Left, Right, and Center (Chicago: Henry Regnery, 1949): explains some of the anomalies of the American labor movement
The Counterfeit Revolution (Boston: Beacon Press, 1952): why Stalinism, despite its corrupt nature, nonetheless appeals to millions of people in the non-communist world
A World in Revolution (1956): revolutionary movements around the world, based on extensive travels
The Crisis of American Labor (1959), which theorized that anti-communist purges had robbed the labor movement of its higher ambitions
Working Men (1960): a history of labor, for young people
Africa, Awakening Giant for young people
The Futile Crusade: Anti-Communism as American Credo (1964): how American foreign policy was being hobbled by equating liberalism and socialism with communism
A Country Is Born (1964): the story of the American Revolution, for young people
Radicalism in America (1966): a history of the American left from 1620 to the present
What Unions Do 
Poverty: America's Enduring Paradox (1969): poverty and anti-poverty programs from the Renaissance to the Great Society
The Military Industrial Complex (Kahn and Averill, 1970)
The Forging of the American Empire (New York: Thomas Y. Crowell Co., 1971): American intervention and imperial expansionism throughout its history
The Labor Wars (New York: Doubleday, 1973): the struggles of the labor movement from the Molly Maguires to the 1930s
Poverty, Yesterday and Today (1973) a history of poverty for young people
The Promise and Pitfalls of Revolution (1974)
The Day Before Doomsday (New York: Doubleday, 1977): On the dangers of nuclear war
The Unrepentant Radical (Boston: Beacon Press, 1980): Autobiography
The Bomb (YA; New York: Dutton, 1982): a history of the arms race
The Maginot Line Syndrome: America's Hopeless Foreign Policy (Ballinger, 1982)
The Permanent War (New York: Schocken, 1987): a shadow, unaccountable American government is committed to maintaining a permanent state of militarism
Vietnam: A War on Two Fronts (YA; New York: Dutton, 1990)

See also
 List of peace activists

References

American trade union leaders
American anti-war activists
American anti–Vietnam War activists
American anti–nuclear weapons activists
20th-century American non-fiction writers
20th-century American historians
American male non-fiction writers
Jewish American historians
Historians of the United States
Labor historians
American political writers
American non-fiction children's writers
American writers of young adult literature
American autobiographers
American tax resisters
Citizens Party (United States) politicians
Illinois politicians
American people of Belarusian-Jewish descent
1912 births
1986 deaths
Deaths from melanoma
Deaths from cancer in Illinois
20th-century American male writers
20th-century American Jews